Sembalur is a village in the Pattukkottai taluk of Thanjavur district, Tamil Nadu, India. At the 2001 census, Sembalur had a total population of 1251 with 633 males and 618 females, and the literacy rate was 57.37%.

References 
 

Villages in Thanjavur district